American Sentinel University was a private for-profit online university focused on nursing education and headquartered in Denver Colorado. It was regionally accredited by the Higher Learning Commission and nationally accredited by the Distance Education Accrediting Commission prior to its acquisition by  Post University in March 2021. Now it is known as the American Sentinel College of Nursing and Health Sciences at Post University and accredited by the New England Commission of Higher Education.

History
American Sentinel University was established through the integration of three separate schools: American College of Computer & Information Sciences, Sentinel University and American Graduate School of Management. The combined school offered the technology programs of the former and the business programs of the latter. The merger also created additional offerings within the same areas and expanded offerings to new areas such as healthcare.

Sentinel University was founded in 2004. The American Graduate School of Management was founded in 2000. The American College of Computer & Information Sciences was founded in 1988 by Lloyd E. Clayton Jr. as the American Institute of Computer Science.

American Sentinel University merged with Post University in March 2021, becoming the American Sentinel College of Nursing & Health Sciences.

Academics
American Sentinel College of Nursing and Health Sciences offers an online Bachelor's degree program for RN to BSN completion (nursing) in a traditional online format as well as a competency-based RN to BSN Powered by SIMPath program. The college offers master's degree programs in nursing and healthcare management. Doctoral degree programs are offered in nursing practice. There is also a certificate program in Infection Prevention and Control.

The university's undergraduate and graduate nursing programs are accredited by the Commission on Collegiate Nursing Education.

References

External links
American Sentinel University home page

For-profit universities and colleges in the United States
Distance education institutions based in the United States
Universities and colleges in Denver
Private universities and colleges in Alabama
Private universities and colleges in Colorado
Educational institutions established in 1988
1988 establishments in Colorado
Universities and colleges formed by merger in the United States